"Snö" ("Snow") is a song by Iranian-Swedish singer-songwriter Laleh recorded with the London Symphony Orchestra for the film Arn - The Knight Templar. It was released on 19 December 2007 as her ninth single and was later included on her third studio album, Me and Simon. The song peaked at No. 14 on the Swedish Singles Chart.

Track listing
 "Snö" – 4:19

Charts

References 

Laleh (singer) songs
2007 singles
2007 songs
Warner Music Group singles
Songs written by Laleh (singer)
Swedish-language songs